The Bibrik is a fat tailed, domesticated breed of meat sheep that is found in Baluchistan Province of Pakistan.

Characteristics
The Bibrik displays white with a black or brown head.

Both sexes are horned with rams having curved horns. On average, rams weigh  and ewes weigh . At birth, rams weigh  and ewes . Normally, ewes give birth to only one lamb at a time, lactate for about 100 days and provide  of milk with 6.5% fat during that period.

References

Sheep breeds originating in Pakistan
Natural history of Balochistan, Pakistan